The pterygopalatine ganglion (aka Meckel's ganglion, nasal ganglion, or sphenopalatine ganglion) is a parasympathetic ganglion found in the pterygopalatine fossa.  It is largely innervated by the greater petrosal nerve (a branch of the facial nerve); and its postsinaptic axons project to the lacrimal glands and nasal mucosa.  The flow of blood to the nasal mucosa, in particular the venous plexus of the conchae, is regulated by the pterygopalatine ganglion and heats or cools the air in the nose.  It is one of four parasympathetic ganglia of the head and neck, the others being the submandibular ganglion, otic ganglion, and ciliary ganglion.

Structure
The pterygopalatine ganglion (of Meckel), the largest of the parasympathetic ganglia associated with the branches of the maxillary nerve, is deeply placed in the pterygopalatine fossa, close to the sphenopalatine foramen. It is triangular or heart-shaped, of a reddish-gray color, and is situated just below the maxillary nerve as it crosses the fossa.

The pterygopalatine ganglion supplies the lacrimal gland, paranasal sinuses, glands of the mucosa of the nasal cavity and pharynx, the gingiva, and the mucous membrane and glands of the hard palate. It communicates anteriorly with the nasopalatine nerve.

Roots
It receives a sensory, a parasympathetic, and a sympathetic root.

Sensory root
Its sensory root is derived from two sphenopalatine branches of the maxillary nerve; their fibers, for the most part, pass directly into the palatine nerves; a few, however, enter the ganglion, constituting its sensory root.

Parasympathetic root
Its parasympathetic root is derived from the nervus intermedius (a part of the facial nerve) through the greater petrosal nerve.

In the pterygopalatine ganglion, the preganglionic parasympathetic fibers from the greater petrosal branch of the facial nerve synapse with neurons whose postganglionic axons, vasodilator, and secretory fibers are distributed with the deep branches of the trigeminal nerve to the mucous membrane of the nose, soft palate, tonsils, uvula, roof of the mouth, upper lip and gums, and upper part of the pharynx.  It also sends postganglionic parasympathetic fibers to the lacrimal nerve (a branch of the ophthalmic nerve, also part of the trigeminal nerve) via the zygomatic nerve, a branch of the maxillary nerve (from the trigeminal nerve), which then arrives at the lacrimal gland.

The nasal glands are innervated with secretomotor fibers from the nasal branches. Likewise, the palatine glands are innervated by the nasopalatine, greater palatine nerve and lesser palatine nerves. The pharyngeal nerve innervates pharyngeal glands. These are all branches of maxillary nerve.

Sympathetic root
The ganglion also consists of sympathetic efferent (postganglionic) fibers from the superior cervical ganglion.  These fibers, from the superior cervical ganglion, travel through the carotid plexus, and then through the deep petrosal nerve. The deep petrosal nerve (carrying postganglionic sympathetics) joins with the greater petrosal nerve (carrying preganglionic parasympathetics) to form the nerve of the pterygoid canal, which passes through the pterygoid canal before entering the ganglion. The stellate ganglion is at the bottom of the cervical sympathetic chain.  Fibers from the stellate ganglion pass up the chain to the superior cervical sympathetic ganglion and into and through the sphenopalatine ganglion.

Branches
Orbital branches
Nasopalatine nerve
Greater palatine nerve
Lesser palatine nerve
Posterior superior lateral nasal branches
Pharyngeal branch of maxillary nerve

Blockade and neuromodulation of the pterygopalatine (sphenopalatine) ganglion

Blockade of the ganglion with local anesthetic, clinically referred to as a ‘sphenopalatine ganglion block’ may be performed transcutaneously with a small needle, or topically via the nose with local anesthetic soaked swabs. The topical sphenopalatine ganglion block is used for treatment of persistent migraines and cluster headaches, demonstrating relief within 10–20 minutes. Sphenopalatine ganglion block has been used to treat post-dural-puncture headache, though a 2020 trial comparing local anaesthetic sphenopalatine ganglion block to sham injection with saline failed to show difference in pain scores for those receiving local anaesthetic vs placebo, suggesting any efficacy is unrelated to local anaesthetic blockade.

Self-administration of sphenopalatine ganglion blocks with cotton-tipped catheters and continual capillary feed is the most cost-effective method of treatment and has the benefit of allowing patients to avoid visits to physicians and emergency rooms.  After initial visit self-administered sphenopalatine ganglion blocks are less than $1.00 per application. Frequent repeated administration of sphenopalatine ganglion blocks seems to increase effectiveness initially, after which decreased frequency is required.  Self-administered sphenopalatine ganglion blocks can be used to treat acute pain symptoms, and prophylactically to reduce the onset of painful conditions and anxiety.

Self-administration of sphenopalatine ganglion blocks

Self-administered sphenopalatine ganglion blocks are extremely helpful for treatment of migraines, chronic daily headaches, anxiety and temporomandibular joint disorders.

The sphenopalatine ganglion block has been called "The Miracle Block" after publication of Albert Bengamin Gerber's book Miracles on Park Avenue, the story of octogenerian otorhinolargyngologist Dr. Milton Reder, whose entire medical practice was based on that procedure.

There are multiple new devices utilized for neuromodulation of the sphenopalatine ganglion.  There is one non-invasive device, a myomonitor, an ultra low frequency transcutaneous electrical nerve stimulation that has been utilized safely for more than 50 years by neuromuscular dentists in the diagnosis and treatment of temporomandibular joint disorders and orofacial pain conditions.  Spenopalatine ganglion neuromodulation (possibly via the vagal nerve) is a secondary effect making it extremely effective for TMD.

Additional images

References

External links
 
 

Parasympathetic ganglia
Autonomic ganglia of the head and neck
Maxillary nerve
Facial nerve